1941 is a 2001 EP release from Soul-Junk. It was released as part of a 3-inch disc series by Absalom Recordings. Its sound is unusual even for Soul-Junk, consisting of purely instrumental electronic music blended with low-fi, jazz, and hip-hop. It is most similar to their album 1956. The song "Rubbernecker" is a remix of the song by the Danielson Famile.

Track listing
"Sticker Shawk"
"Houston"
"Achilles Eye"
"Rubbernecker (slo neck rub remix)"
"Sulphur Puddle (feat. Chuck P.)"

Credits
"All songs rhastered by Rafter Roberts"

References

Soul-Junk EPs
2001 EPs